Skedans, also known variously as  Koona, Q'una, Koona LLnaagay, K'uuna Llnagaay, Q!o'na Inaga'-I, Q:o'na, and Ḵ'uuna Llnagaay  which are variants of its traditional name in the Haida language, is a village located at the head of Cumshewa Inlet in Haida Gwaii, North Coast of British Columbia, Canada.  The name Skedans derived by the practice of captains of the maritime fur trade to name villages after their most prominent chiefs.

The name Skedans is a rendering of Gida'nsta, a Haida term of respect meaning "from his daughter", which is how the reigning chief of the village, Qa'gials qe'gawa-i, was addressed by children (he is usually known as Chief Skedans).  Koona Llnaagay means "Village at the Edge", a reference to the village's location on a small peninsula.  Another Haida name for the village, Huadju-lanas or Xu'adji la'nas, means "Grizzly-Bear-Town", a reference to the large number of portrayals of grizzly bears on the totem poles and other artwork adorning the village.

The village site is part of the Gwaii Haanas National Park Reserve and Haida Heritage Site and is itself a National Historic Site of Canada.

See also
List of Haida villages

References

External links
"Skedans", Canadian Museum of Civilization website
"Q'una", EmilyCarr.org website
"K'uuna Llnagaay (Skedans, Koona)", Parks Canada website

Haida villages
Archaeological sites in British Columbia
Heritage sites in British Columbia
National Historic Sites in British Columbia